The Hubbard Association of Scientologists (HAS) was the original corporation founded in 1952 by L. Ron Hubbard that managed all Scientology organizations.  The HAS evolved from the Office of L. Ron Hubbard located in Phoenix, Arizona. It was re-incorporated later in the year as the Hubbard Association of Scientologists International (HASI) to correct the non-profit status omission in the corporate paperwork.

HASI general members would receive 10% discount on all books, tape lectures and other items from Church bookstores.  HASI membership was a requirement to take services at the various Scientology organizations.

HASI was the sole membership organization for the Church of Scientology prior to October 1984, when the International Association of Scientologists was started.

External links
Incorporation of the HASI
Origins of the HASI

Scientology organizations
Scientology and society
Religious organizations established in 1952